The Tornado was a sailing event on the Sailing at the 1980 Summer Olympics program in Tallinn, USSR. Seven races were scheduled. 22 sailors, on 11 boats, from 11 nations competed.

Results 

DNF = Did Not Finish, DNS= Did Not Start, DSQ = Disqualified, PMS = Premature Start, YMP = Yacht Materially Prejudiced 
 = Male,  = Female

Daily standings

Notes

References 
 
 
 
 

Tornado
Tornado (sailboat)